This is a list of episodes for the television series Pulitzer Prize Playhouse.

Series overview

Episodes

Season 1 (1950–51)

Season 2 (1951–52)

External links
 

Pulitzer Prize Playhouse